Zion Lutheran Church is a historic church northwest of Volin in rural Yankton County, South Dakota.  It is situated 8½ miles east of the Volin exit on U.S. Route 81.  The church was built in 1915 in Gothic Vernacular style. The building is of wood-frame construction with a foundation of concrete block veneer. Stained glass windows, vaulted ceilings and twin steeples are distinctive features of the building. The church was added to the National Register of Historic Places in 1980. The church now houses the Faith United Lutheran Church which is affiliated with the Evangelical Lutheran Church in America

References

External links
Faith United Lutheran Church website

Lutheran churches in South Dakota
Churches on the National Register of Historic Places in South Dakota
Churches completed in 1915
Churches in Yankton County, South Dakota
National Register of Historic Places in Yankton County, South Dakota